Kentucky Route 52 (KY 52) is a  long east–west state highway in Kentucky, United States, managed by the Kentucky Transportation Cabinet.

Its western terminus is at US 62 near Boston, Kentucky. It goes through Nelson, LaRue, Marion, Boyle, Garrard, Madison, Estill, Lee, and Breathitt counties.  Its eastern terminus is at KY 30 in Breathitt County.  It runs through Lebanon, Danville, Lancaster, Richmond, and Beattyville.

In 2005, the  five-lane stretch of KY 52 in Madison County was completed. It now goes from the Richmond By-Pass to Charle Norris Road in Robinsville. Plans are underway to widen the highway from Richmond to Irvine.
The road has also received improvements from Lancaster to I-75.  In Boyle County the concrete deck of a bridge was recently replaced.

Major intersections

References

External links
 State Primary Road System in Nelson County
 State Primary Road System in LaRue County
 State Primary Road System in Marion County
 State Primary Road System in Boyle County
 State Primary Road System in Garrard County
 State Primary Road System in Madison County
 State Primary Road System in Estill County
 State Primary Road System in Lee County
 State Primary Road System in Breathitt County

0052
0052
0052
0052
0052
0052
0052
0052
0052
0052